The Kenyan African mole-rat or Kenyan mole-rat (Tachyoryctes ibeanus) is a species of rodent in the family Spalacidae. It is endemic to Kenya. Its natural habitats are dry savanna, moist savanna, arable land, pastureland, plantations, rural gardens, urban areas, and heavily degraded former forest.

Some taxonomic authorities consider it to be conspecific with the East African mole-rat.

References

Musser, G. G. and M. D. Carleton. 2005. Superfamily Muroidea. pp. 894–1531 in Mammal Species of the World a Taxonomic and Geographic Reference. D. E. Wilson and D. M. Reeder eds. Johns Hopkins University Press, Baltimore.

Mammals of Kenya
Tachyoryctes
Endemic fauna of Kenya
Mammals described in 1900
Taxa named by Oldfield Thomas
Taxonomy articles created by Polbot
Taxobox binomials not recognized by IUCN